Onšov may refer to:

 Onšov (Znojmo District), a village and municipality in the Czech Republic
 Onšov (Pelhřimov District), a village and municipality in the Czech Republic